The 1961 USC Trojans football team represented the University of Southern California (USC) in the 1961 NCAA University Division football season. In their second year under head coach John McKay, the Trojans compiled a 4–5–1 record (2–1–1 against conference opponents), finished in a tie for second place in the Athletic Association of Western Universities, and were outscored by their opponents by a combined total of 167 to 151.

Quarterback Bill Nelsen led the team in passing, completing 39 of 86 passes for 683 yards with four touchdowns and five interceptions. Ben Wilson led the team in rushing, with 619 yards on 139 carries. Hal Bedsole was the team's leading receiver with 27 catches for 525 yards and six touchdowns. Bedsole was inducted into the College Football Hall of Fame in 2012.

Schedule

References

USC
USC Trojans football seasons
USC Trojans football